The Revolt of 1173–1174 was a rebellion against King Henry II of England by three of his sons, his wife Eleanor of Aquitaine, and their rebel supporters. The revolt ended in failure after eighteen months; Henry's rebellious family members had to resign themselves to his continuing rule and were reconciled to him.

Background

King Henry II had been ruling England, Normandy, and Anjou since 1154, while his wife Queen Eleanor ruled the vast territory of Aquitaine since 1137. In 1173 Henry had four legitimate sons (from oldest to youngest): Henry, called the "Young King", Richard (later called "the Lionheart"), Geoffrey, and John ("Lackland"), all of whom stood to inherit some or all of these possessions. Henry also had an illegitimate son, Geoffrey, born probably before the eldest of the legitimate children.

By this time, Henry the Young King was 18 years old and praised for his good looks and charm. He had been long-married to the daughter of Louis VII of France, the former husband of Eleanor (Henry the Young King's mother). Henry the Young King kept a large and glamorous retinue but was constrained by his lack of resources: "he had many knights but he had no means to give rewards and gifts to the knights". The young Henry was therefore anxious to take control of some of his ancestral inheritances to rule in his own right.

The immediate practical cause of the rebellion was Henry II's decision to bequeath three castles, which were within the realm of the Young King's inheritance, to his youngest son, John, as part of the arrangements for John's marriage to the daughter of the Count of Maurienne. At this, Henry the Young King was encouraged to rebel by many aristocrats who saw potential profit and gain in a power transition. His mother Eleanor had been feuding with her husband, and she joined the cause as did many others upset by Henry's possible involvement in the murder of Archbishop Thomas Becket in 1170, which had left Henry alienated throughout Christendom.

In March 1173 Henry the Young King withdrew to the court of his father-in-law, Louis, in France and was soon followed by his brothers Richard and Geoffrey. Eleanor tried to join them but was stopped by Henry II on the way and held in captivity. The Young King and his French mentor created a wide alliance against Henry II by promising land and revenues in England and Anjou to the Counts of Flanders, Boulogne, and Blois; William the Lion, King of the Scots, would have Northumberland. In effect, the Young King would seize his inheritance by breaking it apart.

The revolt

Hostilities began in April when the Counts of Flanders and Boulogne invaded Normandy from the east, the King of France and young Henry from the south, while the Bretons attacked from the west. Each of the assaults ended with failure: the Count of Boulogne was killed, Louis was defeated and kicked out of Normandy, and the Bretons were routed with great loss of life and treasure. William the Lion's attacks in the north of England were also a failure. Negotiations were opened with the rebels in Normandy between father Henry II and son young Henry, to no avail.

The Earl of Leicester, a supporter of young Henry who had been in Normandy and was chief of the aristocratic rebels, took up the charge next. He raised an army of Flemish mercenaries and crossed from Normandy back to England to join the other rebel barons there, principally Hugh Bigod, Earl of Norfolk. The Earl of Leicester was intercepted by the English forces returning from the north in Scotland, led by Richard de Luci, and was completely defeated at Fornham. Henry II's barons supposedly said to him, "It is a bad year for your enemies."

In the spring of 1174 the rebellion continued. David, Earl of Huntingdon, brother of William the Lion, moved back south to attempt the conquest of northern England and took up the leadership of the rebel barons. William de Ferrers, Earl of Derby and one of the rebels, burned the royal burgh of Nottingham while Hugh Bigod likewise torched Norwich.

Henry II, who had been in Normandy fighting his enemies, landed in England on 8 July. His first act was to do penance for the death of Thomas Becket, who was murdered by some of Henry's knights three years earlier and had already been canonized as a saint. The day following the ceremony at Canterbury, on 13 July, in a seeming act of divine providence for Henry II, William the Lion and many of his supporters were surprised and captured at the Battle of Alnwick by a small band of loyalists. In the aftermath Henry II was able to sweep up the opposition, marching through each rebel stronghold to receive their surrenders. With England taken care of, Henry returned to Normandy and set about a settlement with his enemies, and on 30 September "King Henry, the king's son, and his brothers, returned to their father and to his service, as their lord".

Aftermath

The revolt lasted eighteen months, played out across a large area from southern Scotland to Brittany. At least twenty castles in England were recorded as demolished on the orders of the king. Many towns were destroyed and many people were killed. Blame was placed on young Henry's advisors, the rebel barons, who manipulated the inexperienced and rash princes for their own dreams of gain. William Marshal, who was loyal to young Henry during the revolt, said "cursed be the day when the traitors schemed to embroil the father and the son".

References
Notes

Bibliography

Further reading

Bigod family
Conflicts in 1173
Conflicts in 1174
Rebellions in medieval England
1173 in England
1174 in England
12th-century rebellions
Duchy of Normandy
Henry II of England
Richard I of England
Henry the Young King